The following list of countries by charitable donation measures the generosity of nations by showing the percentage of GDP donated to non-profit organizations by individuals. The figures were published in January 2016 by the Charities Aid Foundation (CAF) in its report titled Gross Domestic Philanthropy. The report only considers the 24 countries about which CAF was able to collect comprehensive data.

2016 rankings

See also 
 List of development aid country donors
 List of countries by Official Development Assistance received

References 

Charitable donations